Christopher M. Mueller (born March 6, 1986) is an American professional ice hockey forward. He is currently an unrestricted free agent who most recently played with the Lehigh Valley Phantoms in the American Hockey League (AHL).

Playing career
Undrafted, Mueller attended Michigan State University where he played four full seasons of collegiate hockey in the CCHA.

In the 2010–11 season, on December 27, 2010, Mueller signed a one-year contract with the Predators from American Hockey League affiliate, the Milwaukee Admirals. On December 28, 2010, Mueller made his NHL debut with the Predators in a 4–2 defeat against the Dallas Stars.

On July 7, 2011, Mueller re-signed to a one-year contract with the Predators.

On July 8, 2013 Mueller left the Predators organization after three seasons and signed a one-year contract with the Dallas Stars. On October 14, 2013, after skating in just one NHL contest with the Dallas Stars, Mueller was assigned to play with the Texas Stars of the AHL.

On July 1, 2014, for a second consecutive year, Mueller was on the move, joining his third NHL club, the New York Rangers, on a one-year deal.

Mueller familiarly signed a one-year, two-way contract as a free agent with the Anaheim Ducks on July 1, 2015. In the 2015–16 season, Mueller was assigned to newly relaunched AHL affiliate, the San Diego Gulls. He continued his offensive prowess in the American League, contributing with 57 points in 63 games.

Unable to feature with the Ducks, Mueller left at the conclusion of his contract to sign as a free agent to a one-year, two-way deal with the Arizona Coyotes on July 1, 2016. Mueller played the entirety of the 2016–17 season with the Coyotes AHL affiliate, the Tucson Roadrunners, for their inaugural season. As a veteran on the club, he led the Roadrunners in scoring with 67 points in 68 games.

On July 1, 2017, Mueller left the Coyotes as a free agent and signed a two-year, two-way deal with the Toronto Maple Leafs.

On the opening day of free agency, having concluded a successful tenure within the Maple Leafs organization, Mueller agreed to a one-year, two-way contract with the Tampa Bay Lightning on July 1, 2019. In the 2019–20 season, Mueller registered 23 points in 31 contests with the Lightning's AHL affiliate, the Syracuse Crunch, before he traded by Tampa Bay in a return to the Anaheim Ducks organization in exchange for Patrick Sieloff on December 31, 2019. He was immediately assigned by the Ducks to the San Diego Gulls, returning for a second stint after playing with the Gulls in their inaugural season.

As a free agent heading into the pandemic delayed 2020–21 season, Mueller was signed to a one-year AHL contract with the Lehigh Valley Phantoms, affiliate to the Philadelphia Flyers, on January 26, 2021.

Career statistics

Awards and honors

References

External links

1986 births
Living people
American men's ice hockey right wingers
Cincinnati Cyclones (ECHL) players
Dallas Stars players
Grand Rapids Griffins players
Hartford Wolf Pack players
Ice hockey players from New York (state)
Johnstown Chiefs players
Lake Erie Monsters players
Lehigh Valley Phantoms players
Michigan State Spartans men's ice hockey players
Milwaukee Admirals players
Nashville Predators players
New York Rangers players
San Diego Gulls (AHL) players
Syracuse Crunch players
Texas Stars players
Toronto Marlies players
Tucson Roadrunners players
Undrafted National Hockey League players